Oliver Roberts is an Ireland international rugby league footballer who plays as a  and  for Sheffield Eagles in the RFL Championship.

He played for the Bradford Bulls in the Super League. He spent time on loan from Huddersfield at the Sheffield Eagles in the Kingstone Press Championship, Oldham (Heritage № 1339) in Kingstone Press League 1 and Salford in the Super League.

Background
Roberts was born in Huddersfield, West Yorkshire, England.

Bradford Bulls
Roberts who started his career at the Bradford Bulls was involved in the Bradford Bulls scholarship system from the Under-15s and was given a 3-year professional contract at the start of the 2013 season.

Oliver is a product of the Bradford Bulls Junior Development system.

2013
Roberts missed the pre-season friendlies against the Dewsbury Rams and Leeds Rhinos due to an injury.

He featured in Round 18 (St Helens R.F.C.). Oliver also featured in Round 21 (Wigan Warriors).

2014
Roberts featured in the pre-season games against Hull FC, Dewsbury Rams, and the Castleford Tigers.

He featured in Round 5 (Huddersfield Giants) and then Round 7 (Widnes Vikings). Roberts appeared in Round 10 (Wigan Warriors). He featured in Round 4 (Oldham) in the Challenge Cup.

Roberts secured his dream move to play-off contenders Huddersfield Giants.

Huddersfield

2015
He signed for the Huddersfield Giants on a 2 Year Deal.

In October and November 2015, Roberts was selected in Ireland's team for the 2015 European Cup. He made his international début in Ireland's opening match against France.

2016
Roberts featured in Round 1 (St Helens R.F.C.) to Round 6 (Catalans Dragons) then in Round 8 (Salford Red Devils) to Round 23 (Warrington Wolves). Ollie also played in the Super 8 Qualifier 1 (Salford Red Devils) to Qualifier 7 (Hull Kingston Rovers). He played in the Challenge Cup in Round 6 (Leeds Rhinos). He scored against Salford Red Devils (1 try) and Featherstone Rovers (2 tries).

In 2016 he was called up to the Ireland squad for the 2017 Rugby League World Cup European Pool B qualifiers.

2017
Roberts featured in Round 1 (Widnes Vikings) to Round 3 (Hull F.C.). He scored against Wakefield Trinity (1 try) and Hull F.C. (1 try).

2020
Roberts agreed to extend his current loan deal with Salford Red Devils for the whole 2021 season.

International
Despite having represented Ireland, in 2019 he was one of four Giants players to be called into the England Knights squad

Statistics
Statistics do not include pre-season friendlies.

References

External links
Huddersfield Giants profile
(archived by web.archive.org) Bradford Bulls profile
SL profile
Roberts Signs For Bradford
2017 RWLC profile

1994 births
Living people
Bradford Bulls players
English people of Irish descent
English rugby league players
Halifax R.L.F.C. players
Huddersfield Giants players
Ireland national rugby league team players
Newcastle Thunder players
Oldham R.L.F.C. players
Rugby league locks
Rugby league players from Huddersfield
Rugby league second-rows
Salford Red Devils players
Sheffield Eagles players